Heikki Nousiainen (born 19 June 1945 in Helsinki, Finland) is a Finnish film and television actor. Nousiainen made his acting debut in the television movie Henrik ja Perinlla in 1967.  He entered film in 1971, as both a director and an actor in Saatanan radikaalit and has made over 40 Finnish film and TV appearances to date. He has worked with Finnish director Timo Koivusalo on a number of films such as Sibelius in 2003 and Kaksipäisen kotkan varjossa (2005), as well as in other Finnish movies and TV series. In 2006 he starred in 3 different films. Nousiainen is also known as playing President Urho Kekkonen in TV series Vallan miehet (1986), Presidentit (2006) and Piru ja peijooni (2008).

Filmography 
 Henrik ja Pernilla (1967) (TV)
 Saatanan radikaalit (1971)
 Rakastunut rampa (1975)
 Lottovoittaja UKK Turhapuro (1976)
 Jäniksen vuosi (1977)
 Hullu kesä (1981)
 V.Y. Vihdoinkin yhdessä (1986)
 Lain ulkopuolella (1987)
 Kultainen koskelo (1989)
 Kiljusen herrasväen uudet seikkailut (1990)
 Keskiyön aurinko (1991)
 Mestari (1992)
 Maraton (1997)
 Pekko ja unissakävelijä (1997)
 Siivoton juttu (1997)
 Johtaja Uuno Turhapuro - pisnismies (1998)
 Kulkuri ja Joutsen (1999)
 Pelon maantiede (2000)
 Hurmaava joukkoitsemurha (2000)
 Ei siihen kuole (2003)
 Sibelius (2003)
 Lapsia ja aikuisia - Kuinka niitä tehdään? (2004)
 Paha maa (2005)
 Kaksipäisen kotkan varjossa (2005)
 Postia pappi Jaakobille (2009)
 Forbidden Fruit (2009)
 Euthanizer (2017)
 One Last Deal (2018)

External links 

1945 births
Living people
Male actors from Helsinki
Finnish male film actors
Finnish male television actors